Bruce William Hocker (August 6, 1894 – August 1, 1975) was a Negro leagues first baseman for several years before the founding of the first Negro National League.

Hocker registered for the World War I draft on June 5, 1917, showing his current occupation as a "musician" at the Kipps Parkway Hotel on "South Boulevard in Bronx Park." He is listed as single and no exemptions from the draft.

References

External links
 and Baseball-Reference Black Baseball stats and Seamheads

1894 births
1975 deaths
Baseball players from Indiana
Dayton Marcos players
Hilldale Club players
Indianapolis ABCs players
Lincoln Stars (baseball) players
Louisville White Sox (1914-1915) players
Pennsylvania Red Caps of New York players
West Baden Sprudels players
20th-century African-American sportspeople